Thomas W. Hawkins Jr. (born 10 January 1938 in Flushing, New York) is an American historian of mathematics.

Hawkins defended his Ph.D. thesis on "The Origins and Early Development of Lebesgue's Theory of Integration" at the University of Wisconsin-Madison in 1968 under Robert Creighton Buck. Since 1972 he has been based at Boston University. Hawkins was an invited speaker at the International Congress of Mathematicians in 1974 at Vancouver and in 1986 at Berkeley.

In 1997 Hawkins was awarded the Chauvenet Prize for his article "The birth of Lie's theory of groups", published in the Mathematical Intelligencer in 1994. In fall 2012 Hawkins was elected a Fellow of the American Mathematical Society.

Selected publications

Articles
 The Theory of Matrices in the 19th Century. In: Ralph D. James (ed.): Proceedings of the International Congress of Mathematicians, Vancouver, 1974. CMC, Vancouver 1975, vol. 2, pp. 561–570.
 Hypercomplex numbers, Lie groups and the creation of group representation theory. In: Archive for History of Exact Sciences, vol. 8 (1971/72), pp. 243–287. 
 The origins of the theory of group characters. In: Archive for History of Exact Sciences, vol. 7 (1970), pp. 142–170. 
 New light on Frobenius creation of the theory of group characters. In: Archive for History of Exact Sciences, vol. 12 (1974), pp. 217–243. 
 Wilhelm Killing and the structure of Lie algebras. In: Archive for History of Exact Sciences, vol. 26 (1982), pp. 126–192. 
 Non-euclidean geometry and Weierstrassian mathematics. The background to Killing's work on Lie algebras. In: Historia Mathematica, vol. 7 (1980), pp. 289–342.

Books
 Emergence of the theory of Lie groups. An Essay in the history of Mathematics 1869-1926 (Sources and studies in the history of mathematics and physical series). Springer Verlag, New York 2000, .
 Lebesgue's Theory of Integration. Its Origin and Development. 2nd edition. AMS Chelsea Books, New York 1979, ; reprint with corrections of original edition published by University of Wisconsin Press 1970; 
 The mathematics of Frobenius in context. A journey through 18th to 20th century mathematics. Springer, New York 2013, .

References

1938 births
University of Wisconsin–Madison alumni
Boston University faculty
American historians of mathematics
Living people
Fellows of the American Mathematical Society